Brandon Maxwell (born March 22, 1991) is an American professional ice hockey goaltender who is currently playing for the Malmö Redhawks of the Swedish Hockey League (SHL). He was drafted 154th overall in the sixth round by the Colorado Avalanche in the 2009 NHL Entry Draft, but went unsigned.

Playing career
Maxwell took the AHMMPL junior league, where he defended the Cambridge Hawks during the 2006–07 season, through the USA Hockey National Team Development Program in Ann Arbor, Michigan, where he was a member of the U17 and U18 national team. In both age categories, he captured the 2008 World U18 Championship tournament and has won the bronze medal. From 2009 to 2012, he worked in the Canadian junior league, the Ontario Hockey League (Kitchener Rangers, Sarnia Sting, Mississauga St. Michael's Majors). During the 2012–13 season, he played hockey at the University of Guelph and also tried the Ukrainian Hockey League team, the Berkut Kiev. The following year he spent in the Swedish Hockey League, where he captured 40 games for Rögle BK.

In the 2014–15 season, when he had one for Utah Grizzlies of the ECHL, he was approached by the HC Vítkovice. Maxwell, however, despite his good introduction to the Ostrava region, did not last long. He played five games with a g.a.a of 3.73 and a sv% of .853 Otherwise, he usually  was on  the bench . After a year in [Vítkovice], he left, but he remained in the Czech Extraliga. Before the start of the 2015–16 season, the [HC Dynamo Pardubice] signed him. Even though he was only playing in his first season in eastern Bohemia, he was one of their best players throughout the season.

He has also captured a total of 144 matches in the Czech Extraliga with a G.A.A of 2.42 and a Sv% .918 with 11 shutouts. He then moved as a free agent to play in Austria where he was a star for Villacher SV. Maxwell then moved to neighbouring Germany, featuring in parts of three seasons with the Fischtown Penguins of the Deutsche Eishockey Liga (DEL).

During the 2022–23 season, having posted 8 wins through 12 appearances with the Fischtown Pinguins, Maxwell left the club to sign a contract with Swedish top flight club, Malmö Redhawks, on January 6, 2023, providing cover for injured starting goaltender Daniel Marmenlind.

International play

Maxwell was a member of the United States team that competed at the 2018 Winter Olympics.

Personal life
Although Maxwell competes for the United States internationally, he holds dual citizenship with both the US and Canada.

Career statistics

Regular season and playoffs

International

References

External links

1991 births
Living people
American expatriate ice hockey players in Austria
American expatriate ice hockey players in Canada
American expatriate ice hockey players in Russia
American expatriate ice hockey players in Sweden
American expatriate ice hockey players in the Czech Republic
American expatriate ice hockey players in Ukraine
American men's ice hockey goaltenders
BK Mladá Boleslav players
Colorado Avalanche draft picks
Fischtown Pinguins players
HC Berkut players
HC Dynamo Pardubice players
HC Vítkovice players
Hokej Šumperk 2003 players
Ice hockey people from Florida
Ice hockey players at the 2018 Winter Olympics
Kitchener Rangers players
Malmö Redhawks players
Mississauga St. Michael's Majors players
Stadion Hradec Králové players
Olympic ice hockey players of the United States
Rögle BK players
Sarnia Sting players
Sportspeople from Winter Park, Florida
University of Guelph alumni
USA Hockey National Team Development Program players
Utah Grizzlies (ECHL) players
EC VSV players